Pablo Antonio Salinas Menchaca (born 7 August 1979 in Santa Cruz de la Sierra) is a Bolivian football forward who currently plays for Club Destroyers.

Career
Salinas played for Categoría Primera A side Deportes Quindío, where he became the first Bolivian player to score a goal for the Colombian club in 2010.

National team
Salinas made his debut for the Bolivia national team on 15 November 2006 in a friendly match against El Salvador (5-1), as a substitute for goal scorer Nelson Sossa. He has 3 appearances for Bolivia.

References

1979 births
Living people
Sportspeople from Santa Cruz de la Sierra
Bolivian footballers
Bolivia international footballers
Bolivian expatriate footballers
Bolivian Primera División players
Categoría Primera A players
Club Blooming players
Club Real Potosí players
The Strongest players
Club Bolívar players
Oriente Petrolero players
C.D. Jorge Wilstermann players
Deportes Quindío footballers
Club San José players
Expatriate footballers in Colombia
Association football forwards